Rudolf Jelen (27 January 1876 – 10 March 1938) was a Czechoslovak sports shooter. He competed for Czechoslovakia at the 1920 Summer Olympics and the 1924 Summer Olympics.

References

External links
 
 

1876 births
1938 deaths
Czechoslovak male sport shooters
Olympic shooters of Czechoslovakia
Shooters at the 1920 Summer Olympics
Shooters at the 1924 Summer Olympics
Place of birth missing